Hiley is a name. Notable people with the surname include:

Basil Hiley (born 1935), British quantum physicist
David Hiley (born 1947), British musicologist
Joseph Hiley (1902–1989), British politician
Scott Hiley (born 1968), English footballer
Thomas Hiley (1905–1990), Australian politician

See also 

 Hiley Bamsey (1916–1943), English footballer